Clarita is a small unincorporated community in Coal County, Oklahoma, United States. The post office was established January 19, 1910.

Clarita's school district, Olney Public School District, is one of the smallest public school districts in the state of Oklahoma. For the most recent data available, for a combined district, K-12, Olney finished between Boley (51) and Sweetwater (60), with 58 students. Olney School is now closed although the reunion is still held at the lunch room.

The Census Bureau defined a census-designated place (CDP) for Clarita in 2015; the 2010 population within the 2015 CDP boundary is 171 and contains 70 housing units.

Demographics

References

External links
History of Clarita

Unincorporated communities in Coal County, Oklahoma
Unincorporated communities in Oklahoma